The Yellow Clinic (Swedish: Gula kliniken) is a 1942 Swedish drama film directed by Ivar Johansson and starring Arnold Sjöstrand, Viveca Lindfors and Nils Lundell. It was made at the Centrumateljéerna Studios in Stockholm with location shooting also taking place at the Södersjukhuset and the Karolinska Hospitals in the city. The film's sets were designed by the art director Bertil Duroj.

Synopsis
The head of a woman's clinic is firmly against abortion, but one of his doctors has opposing views.

Cast
 Arnold Sjöstrand as 	Dr. Jörn
 Viveca Lindfors as 	Nurse Doris
 Nils Lundell as 	Olsson
 Gudrun Brost as Nurse Olga
 Åke Grönberg as Herman Karlsson
 Barbro Kollberg as 	Irma Svensson, maid
 Barbro Ribbing as 	Margit Wall
 Henrik Schildt as Einar Franke
 Sten Lindgren as 	Dr. Nizzen
 Gösta Cederlund as 	Prof. Wall
 Karin Kavli as Miss Lind, actress
 Anna Lindahl as 	Mrs. Olsson
 Mona Mårtenson as 	Mrs. Andersson
 Folke Hamrin as 	Dr. Åkerholm
 Gull Natorp as 	Nurse Dagmar
 Arthur Fischer as 	Sailor
 Bellan Roos as 	Mrs. Karlsson
 Millan Bolander as Nurse Dagmar 
 Ingrid Envall as Mrs. Berglund
 Erik Hell as First Mate 
 Bertil Hilbert as 	Dr. Jönsson 
 Gerda Landgren as 	Mrs. Lundkvist 
 Greta Liming as 	Mrs. Krantz 
 Helge Mauritz as 	Sterner, engineer
 Ruth Stevens as 	Mrs. Lorell

References

Bibliography 
 Qvist, Per Olov & von Bagh, Peter. Guide to the Cinema of Sweden and Finland. Greenwood Publishing Group, 2000.

External links 
 

1942 films
Swedish drama films
1942 drama films
1940s Swedish-language films
Films directed by Ivar Johansson
Swedish black-and-white films
1940s Swedish films